Ali El-Kashef (born 1917, date of death unknown) was an Egyptian sports shooter. He competed in the 25 metre pistol event at the 1960 Summer Olympics.

References

1917 births
Year of death missing
Egyptian male sport shooters
Olympic shooters of Egypt
Shooters at the 1960 Summer Olympics
Sportspeople from Cairo